Derevnya Kozhzavoda (Künzavod) is a rural locality (a village) in Temyasovsky Selsoviet, Baymaksky District, Bashkortostan, Russia. The population was 148 as of 2010. There are 4 streets.

Geography 
The village is located 57 km north of Baymak (the district's administrative centre) by road. Aminevo is the nearest rural locality.

References 

Rural localities in Baymaksky District